Renata Katewicz (born May 2, 1965 in Kaniczki, Pomorskie) is a retired female discus thrower from Poland. She represented her native country twice at the Summer Olympics; in 1988 and 1996. Katewicz is best known for winning the gold medal in the women's discus event at the 1993 Summer Universiade in Buffalo, United States.

International competitions

References
sports-reference

1965 births
Living people
People from Kwidzyn County
Sportspeople from Pomeranian Voivodeship
Polish female discus throwers
Olympic athletes of Poland
Athletes (track and field) at the 1988 Summer Olympics
Athletes (track and field) at the 1996 Summer Olympics
World Athletics Championships athletes for Poland
Universiade medalists in athletics (track and field)
Universiade gold medalists for Poland
Competitors at the 1989 Summer Universiade
Medalists at the 1993 Summer Universiade